Samuel Adjei Asirifi (born 22 May 1948) is a Ghanaian politician and a member of the first Parliament of the fourth Republic representing the Effiduasi-Asokore Constituency in the Ashanti Region of Ghana.

Early life and education
Asirifi was born on 22 May 1948 in the Ashanti Region of Ghana. He attended the S.D.A. Secondary School and obtained his GCE Ordinary Level certificate.

Politics
Asirifi was elected into parliament on the ticket of the National Democratic Congress to represent the Effiduase-Asokore Constituency in the Ashanti Region of Ghana during the December 1992 Ghanaian parliamentary Election. He was succeeded by Grace Coleman of the New Patriotic Party who polled 13,154 votes out of the total valid votes cast representing 54.90% over her opponents Opoku-Mensah Kofi of the National Democratic Congress who polled 5,923 votes representing 24.70% and Bashiru M. Abdallah of the People's National Congress who also polled 0 vote representing 0%.

Career
Asirifi is poultry farmers and a former member of Parliament for the Effiduase-Asokore Constituency in the Ashanti Region of Ghana.

Personal life
Samuel is a Christian.

References

Living people
National Democratic Congress (Ghana) politicians
1948 births
Ghanaian Christians
People from Ashanti Region
Ghanaian MPs 1993–1997